Svensk Damtidning (Swedish: Swedish Women's Weekly) is a weekly women's magazine published in Sweden since 1889. The magazine is headquartered in Helsingborg.

History and profile
The magazine was established in 1889. Svensk Damtidning is part of Aller Media and is published by Aller Media AB on a weekly basis. Its headquarters is in Helsingborg.

During the initial period Svensk Damtidning targeted all women without a special reference concerning social class, but later it is called a royal lifestyle magazine. The magazine began to cover celebrity news from the 1970s and focuses on the news about the European royal families. Its audience is women aged between 20 and 49.

Men's magazine, Café, is its one of sister magazines.

Just after one year after its publication Svensk Damtidning became the second best-selling women's magazine in Sweden. In 2007 the magazine sold 139,00 copies making it the eighth largest magazine in the country. Both in 2011 and in 2013 the magazine was the sixth best-selling magazine in Sweden. The 2011 circulation of the magazine was 145,600 copies. Its circulation was 144,600 copies in 2013.

References

External links

1889 establishments in Sweden
Celebrity magazines
Magazines established in 1889
Mass media in Helsingborg
Swedish-language magazines
Women's magazines published in Sweden
Weekly magazines published in Sweden